The Tolai language, or Kuanua, is spoken by the Tolai people of Papua New Guinea, who live on the Gazelle Peninsula in East New Britain Province.

Nomenclature
This language is often referred to in the literature as Tolai. However, Tolai is actually the name of the cultural group.

Characteristics

Unlike many languages in Papua New Guinea, Tolai is a healthy language and not in danger of dying out to Tok Pisin, although even Tolai suffers from a surfeit of loanwords from Tok Pisin; e.g. the original  has been completely usurped by the Tok Pisin  for 'brown', and the Tok Pisin  for 'bicycle' has replaced the former . It is considered a prestigious language and is the primary language of communication in the two major centers of East New Britain: Kokopo and Rabaul.

Tolai lost the phoneme . However,  has been reintroduced through numerous loanwords from English and Tok Pisin.

Classification
Tolai belongs to the Oceanic branch of the Austronesian language family. The most immediate subgroup is the Patpatar–Tolai group of languages which also includes Lungalunga (also spoken on the Gazelle Peninsula) and Patpatar (spoken on New Ireland).

Geographic distribution
Tolai is spoken on the Gazelle Peninsula in the East New Britain Province of Papua New Guinea.

Derived languages
Tolai is said to be one of the major substratum languages of Tok Pisin. Some common Tok Pisin vocabulary items that likely come from Tolai (or a closely related language) include:

  (from ) - Hibiscus manihot
  - 'betelnut'
  (from ) - 'tree, wood'
  - 'earthquake'
  (from ) - 'ginger'
  - 'egg'
  - 'elderly person'
  (from ) - 'small'
  (from ) - 'fishing net'

Grammar

Phonology
Phonology of the Tolai language:

Independent pronouns

Tolai pronouns have four number distinctions (singular, dual, trial and plural) and three person distinctions (first person, second person and third person) as well as an inclusive/exclusive distinction. There are no gender distinctions.

The plural pronouns lose their final -t when used before a verb. 
 - 'Let's go!'
 - 'We didn't see.'
 - 'They have already arrived.'

Syntax
The usual word order of Tolai is agent–verb–object (AVO/SVO).

Morphology
There is an irregular pattern involving the prefix , which changes a verb to a noun. Ordinarily, the prefix is added to the verb, as in  'to live' →  'the life',  'to eat' →  'the food',  'to pray' →  'the prayer'. However, in some cases it becomes an infix :  'to fight' →  'the fight',  'to talk' →  'the language',  'to chew betelnut' →  '(a small supply of) betelnuts for chewing'. This infix is inserted after the initial phoneme of the verb. It could also be described as the prefix  being added as a prefix, and the initial phoneme of the verb changing places with the n of the prefix.

Notes

References

External links

Tolai Language Course
Language Museum page on Tolai
A number of collections in Paradisec include materials in Tolai

Languages of East New Britain Province
Subject–verb–object languages
St George linkage